Manu the Great was a Chaldean god who "presided over fate".

Manu the Great is unrelated to and should not be confused with the Hindu progenitor of mankind, Manu nor any of his manifestations.

He is referred to as one of the dii minores, or minor deities, of ancient Chaldea by Lenormant in his 1875 work, Chaldean Magic:

Henry George Tomkins, an Exeter clergyman and member of the Royal Archaeological Society, saw Manu as a possible link to the "sons of Anak", mentioned in the Old Testament:

He is also listed in Gustav Davidson's A Dictionary of Angels. Both Tomkins and Davidson cite only Lenormant for their reference to Manu the Great.

References

Time and fate gods
Chaldea
Mesopotamian gods